Det skete på Møllegården is a 1960 Danish family film directed by Alice O'Fredericks and Robert Saaskin.

Cast
 Poul Reichhardt - Martin Poulsen
 Christian Arhoff - Mikkel Vind
 Ib Mossin - Anders
 Astrid Villaume - Anna Kjeldsen
 Lisbeth Movin - Martha
 Helga Frier - Mathilde
 Else Hvidhøj - Marie Kjeldsen
 Jørn Jeppesen - Bertel Simonsen
 Hans W. Petersen - Søren Fedthas
 Bertel Lauring - Jesper
 Anker Taasti - Carlo
 Freddy Koch - Customs Assistant Petersen
 Ove Rud - Customs Assistant Jørgensen
 Knud Hallest - Gårdejer Kjeldsen
 Knud Schrøder - Gunnar Kjeldsen
 Christian Brochorst - Innkeeper
 Kurt Erik Nielsen - Customs security
 Niels Thor - Assistant
 Anne Margrethe - Dorte
 Ole Neumann - Claus
 Niels Brochorst
 Hugo Herrestrup - Maries boyfriend

References

External links

1960 films
Danish children's films
1960s Danish-language films
Films directed by Alice O'Fredericks
Films scored by Sven Gyldmark
ASA Filmudlejning films